This is a list of the best-selling singles in 1991 in Japan, as reported by Oricon.

See also
List of Oricon number-one singles of 1991

References

1991 in Japanese music
1991
Oricon
Japanese music-related lists